Sonari Assembly constituency is one of the 126 assembly constituencies of Assam Legislative Assembly. Sonari forms part of the Jorhat Lok Sabha constituency.

Members of Legislative Assembly 
 1951: Purnanada Chetia, Indian National Congress
 1957: Purnanada Chetia, Indian National Congress (PS No.79)
 1962: Bimala Prasad Chaliha, Indian National Congress (PS No.90)
 1967: Bimala Prasad Chaliha, Indian National Congress (PS No.110)
 1972: Janakinath Handique, Indian National Congress (PS No.110)
 1978: Satya Tanti, Indian National Congress (PS No.106)
 1983: Satya Tanti, Indian National Congress
 1985: Bhadreswar Buragohain, Independent, later Asom Gana Parishad
 1991: Sarat Barkotoky, Indian National Congress
 1996: Sarat Barkotoky, Indian National Congress
 2001: Sarat Barkotoky, Indian National Congress
 2006: Sarat Barkotoky, Indian National Congress
 2011: Sarat Barkotoky, Indian National Congress
 2016: Topon Kumar Gogoi, Bharatiya Janata Party
 2019 (by-elections): Nabanita Handique, Bharatiya Janata Party
 2021: Dharmeswar Konwar, Bharatiya Janata Party

Election results

2019 bypoll

2016 result 

Hai

References

External links 
 

Assembly constituencies of Assam